Sideswipe or Sideswiped may refer to:

 Sideswipe (G.I. Joe), a fictional character in the G.I. Joe universe
 Sideswipe (Gladiators), a Gladiators event
 Sideswipe (Transformers), a robot superhero character from the Transformers robot superhero franchise.
 Sideswiped in a collision, see Side collision
 Sideswiped (TV series), 2018 Comedy TV Series by Carly Craig

See also
 Swipe (disambiguation)